Gabriel Alves (born 10 February 2000) is a Brazilian professional footballer who plays as a defender and midfielder for Birmingham Legion in USL Championship.

College career 
Alves played soccer for Marshall University from 2020 until 2022. He made a total of 52 appearances and scored 2 goals over three seasons for the team. He was a part of the team that won the 2020 NCAA College Cup.

Club career

Birmingham Legion 
Alves signed with Birmingham Legion in the USL Championship on January 26, 2023. On 11 March, Alves was subbed on in the 77th minute of the Legion's season opener against the Pittsburgh Riverhounds, which ended in 1–1 draw.

Honours 
Marshall Thundering Herd

 Conference USA regular season: 2020
 NCAA National Championship: 2020

References

External links 

 Gabriel Alves at Marshall Thundering Herd
 Gabriel Alves at Birmingham Legion

1999 births
Living people
Association football midfielders
Association football defenders
Brazilian expatriate sportspeople in the United States
Expatriate soccer players in the United States
Marshall Thundering Herd men's soccer players
USL Championship players
Brazilian footballers
Brazilian expatriate footballers
Birmingham Legion FC players